This is a list of Dutch television related events from 1988.

Events
Unknown - Jos Van den Brom, performing as John Denver, wins the fourth series of Soundmixshow.

Debuts

Domestic
3 January - Het Klokhuis (1988–present)

International
16 April -  DuckTales

Television shows

1950s
NOS Journaal (1956–present)

1970s
Sesamstraat (1976–present)

1980s
Jeugdjournaal (1981–present)
Soundmixshow (1985-2002)

Ending this year

Births
2 January - Tess Milne, TV presenter

Deaths